USS Swift is a name used more than once by the United States Navy:
 , a schooner captured by the Union Navy and employed as a ship's tender
 , a minesweeper commissioned on 29 December 1943
 , a mine countermeasures and sea basing test platform ship that was used by the U.S. Navy from 2003 to 2013

References 

United States Navy ship names